Alphitonia marquesensis is a species of plant in the family Rhamnaceae. It is endemic to French Polynesia.

References

marquesensis
Flora of French Polynesia
Least concern flora of Oceania
Taxonomy articles created by Polbot
Plants described in 1935